Fly Yellow Moon is the debut solo album from British artist Fyfe Dangerfield, known as the frontman of the band, Guillemots. It was released on 18 January 2010 in the United Kingdom on Polydor Records. "She Needs Me" was released as the lead single in the UK, while "When You Walk in the Room" was released in the U.S. (in the UK it was given away for free on Dangerfield's web site). "Faster Than the Setting Sun" was released as the second UK single.

A deluxe edition of the album was released on 17 May 2010 featuring the single version of "Faster Than the Setting Sun", "She's Always a Woman" and two further bonus tracks.

Track listing

Personnel
The following people are credited on the album:

Production
Adam Noble – producer, mixing
Bernard Butler – mixing, additional production (tracks 5, 8, 13)
Dick Beetham – mastering

Additional musicians
Matt Ingram – drums (tracks 1, 3, 10)
Jamie Morrison – drums (all other tracks)
Laurence Love Greed – whistling (track 4)
Bernard Butler – electric guitar (track 8)

Artwork
David Robinson – photography
Denis Gabillat – art direction

References

External links
Official Fyfe Dangerfield Website

2010 debut albums
Fyfe Dangerfield albums
Albums produced by Bernard Butler
Polydor Records albums